Cotham railway station was a railway station serving the village of Cotham, Nottinghamshire. It was the only intermediate station on the Great Northern Railway Newark to Bottesford line, which was effectively a northern continuation of the Great Northern and London and North Western Joint Railway.
It opened in 1879. It was served by through services to the joint line, but only one of these remained in 1910 and this had been withdrawn by 1922. Although Cotham station itself closed in 1939 occasional passenger services between Nottingham to Newark continued to use the line until 1955.

References

Disused railway stations in Nottinghamshire
Railway stations in Great Britain opened in 1879
Railway stations in Great Britain closed in 1939
Former Great Northern Railway stations